The One is a 2001 epic science fiction action film directed by James Wong, written by Wong and Glen Morgan, and starring Jet Li, Delroy Lindo, Carla Gugino, and Jason Statham.

The film, which deals with the concept of multiverses and interdimensional travel, follows Gabriel Yulaw (Jet Li), a rogue agent who travels to parallel realities in order for him to kill other versions of himself to become a mythical super-being known as "The One". Li plays a dual role as Yulaw and Gabe Law, an LASD deputy sheriff who teams up with a multiverse agent to prevent Yulaw from becoming the One.

The film was released in the United States by Columbia Pictures on November 2, 2001, and received negative critical reviews but grossed $78.5 million worldwide.

Plot
Gabriel Yulaw (Jet Li), once an agent of the MultiVerse Authority (MVA) which polices interdimensional travel, seeks to hunt down all variations of himself in alternate universes. By killing 124 versions of his other selves and absorbing their life energies, Yulaw believes that he will become a superpowered-godlike being called "The One".

After killing Lawless, the 123rd variation in the Anubis Universe, Yulaw is captured by MVA agents Roedecker (Delroy Lindo) and Funsch (Jason Statham) and taken back to the MVA headquarters in the Alpha Universe. After he is sentenced to life in the Stygian penal colony in the Hades Universe, Yulaw manages to escape with the help of his lover and teleports to the Charis Universe where the last variation of himself lives.

The last known variation, Gabe Law, is a deputy sheriff working in the Los Angeles County Sheriff's Department. For two years, Gabe has been experiencing increases in strength, speed, and mental ability, but neither he nor his wife T.K. (Carla Gugino) can understand why. While transporting a prisoner, Gabe "feels" Yulaw's presence in time to avoid being shot. Gabe sustains an injury after falling from a wall which Yulaw scales with ease. Roedecker and Funsch arrive in time to stop Yulaw from finishing off Gabe.

Although unfamiliar with interdimensional travel, Gabe realizes that Yulaw is identical to him in every way. Rodecker and Funsch track Yulaw to the hospital where Gabe is being examined. Yulaw deters them from shooting him because if he is killed, Gabe would then be left as the One. Dressed alike and identical to each other, Gabe and Yulaw's battle confuses the other police officers. Both Gabe and Yulaw manage to escape the hospital.

The MVA agents deviate from their orders and split up. Roedecker pursues and fights Yulaw but is killed when the latter breaks his neck, disabling a bomb Roedecker intended to use to finish both of them off. Funsch catches up with Gabe and explains to him that there are multiple universes with wormholes briefly connecting them at uncontrollable times. Yulaw sneaks into Gabe's residence where T.K., believing him to be Gabe, agrees to hide him from the police. She realizes that Yulaw is deceiving her but not in time to avoid being captured. Gabe arrives, only to watch helplessly as Yulaw kills T.K. Funsch finds a guilt-ridden Gabe and both team up to find Yulaw at the next wormhole.

Gabe and Funsch arrive at an industrial plant, where they encounter and fight Yulaw. Funsch is easily defeated but Gabe and Yulaw are more evenly matched. Gabe manages to gain the upper hand but only seconds before the wormhole arrives. All three of them are sucked into it and collapse on the floor of the MVA headquarters. Yulaw is transported immediately to the Hades Universe after a failed attempt to switch places with Gabe. The MVA then prepares to send Gabe back to his own universe, where he will be arrested and put into prison for the crimes that Yulaw committed. Recalling an earlier conversation with Gabe, Funsch compassionately sends him to a different universe in which Gabe can have a normal life again from when he first met T.K.

Meanwhile, Yulaw, now on the stygian penal colony in the Hades Universe, declares that he will still become the One and then proceeds to battle a prison inmate. Finally, the camera then pulls back to show an army of other prison inmates taking on Yulaw on top of a ziggurat.

Cast
 Jet Li as:
 Officer Gabe Law, an L.A.S.D. Deputy Sheriff and martial artist from Charis Universe. 
 Gabriel Yulaw, a former Multiverse Authority (M.V.A.) agent from Alpha Universe.
 Yu Fook Law, a rastafari from Monoceros Universe and one of Yulaw's victims.
 Swen Law, a surfer from Tucana Universe and one of Yulaw's victims.
 Ni Dilaw, from Canopus Universe and one of Yulaw's victims.
 Kia Jilaw, from Serpens Universe and one of Yulaw's victims.
 Seth Law, a long haired man from Procyon Universe and one of Yulaw's victims.
 Frun Law, from Shaula Universe and one of Yulaw's victims.
 Lawless, a notorious and violent criminal from Anubis Universe and one of Yulaw's victims.
 Jason Statham as Agent Evan Funsch, a Multiverse Authority (M.V.A.) agent from Alpha Universe and Agent Rodecker's current partner.
 Delroy Lindo as: 
 Agent Harry Rodecker, a Multiverse Authority (M.V.A.) agent from Alpha Universe who is Yulaw's archenemy and former partner.
 Arri, a gas station attendant from Charis Universe.
 Carla Gugino as:
 T.K. Law, a doctor and Gabe Law's wife in Charis Universe. 
 Massie Walsh, a sexy red haired criminal and Gabriel Yulaw's girlfriend and lover in Alpha Universe.
 an unnamed vet from the unknown Universe.
 James Morrison as: 
 Officer Bobby Aldrich, Gabe Law's fellow officer in the L.A.S.D. in the Charis Universe.
 Anubis Universe Inmate #1, an unnamed inmate and Lawless' enemy in the Anubis Universe.
 Dylan Bruno as Officer Yates, Gabe Law's fellow officer in the L.A.S.D. from Anubis Universe and Charis Universe.
 Richard Steinmetz as Officer D'Antoni, Gabe Law's fellow officer in the L.A.S.D. from Anubis Universe and Charis Universe.
 Archie Kao as Officer Woo, Gabe Law's fellow officer in the L.A.S.D. from Anubis Universe and Charis Universe.
 Dean Norris as L.A.S.D. Sergeant Siegel from Anubis Universe and Charis Universe.
 Steve Rankin as M.V.A. Supervisor
 Tucker Smallwood as Prison Warden of M.V.A.
 Harriet Sansom Harris as Nurse Besson
 Mark Borchardt as Cesar
 Doug Savant as L.A.P.D. officer (uncredited)

Production
Originally the film was to have starred Dwayne "The Rock" Johnson, before Li assumed the lead role. However, Dwayne "The Rock" Johnson and among other Hollywood stars including Samuel L. Jackson were declined from Jet Li's lead role.

The hospital scenes were filmed at the North Hollywood Medical Center.

The documentary Jet Li is 'The One on the special features section on the DVD explains that both Gabriel Yulaw and "Gabe" Law use martial arts that represent their personalities. Yulaw uses Xingyiquan (The Shape-Will Fist), characterized by aggressive linear movements, while Gabe uses Baguazhang (The Eight Trigram Palms) which uses subtle, circular movements. These martial arts are confirmed by their own personalities as Yulaw is very direct, not caring whom he hurts, while Gabe believes life goes in a circle, perfectly balanced.

Soundtrack
The score was composed by Trevor Rabin and was released on December 11, 2001, but no soundtrack album was released. Noted songs in the film: 
 Disturbed - "Down with the Sickness"
 Drowning Pool - "Bodies" and "Sinner"
 Godsmack - "Awake"
 Linkin Park - "Papercut" and "One Step Closer"
 Papa Roach - "Last Resort" and "Blood Brothers"

Reception
For its initial theatrical release, the film grossed $43.9 million in the United States and Canada and $28.7 million internationally, grossing $72.7 million worldwide. The film was released in the United Kingdom on April 12, 2004 and grossed $1.3 million, boosting the film's worldwide cume to $74 million.

Critical response
The film received mostly negative reviews. The site's critics consensus reads, "The One plays more like a video game than a movie and borrows freely from other, better sci-fi actioners, burying Jet Li's spectacular talents under heaps of editing and special effects." On Metacritic, the film has a weighted average score of 25 out of 100 based on reviews from 21 critics, indicating "generally unfavorable reviews". Audiences surveyed by CinemaScore gave the film a grade "B" on scale of A to F.

Roger Ebert gave the film 1.5 out of 4 stars, calling it "brainless high-tech action without interesting dialogue, characters, motivation or texture." Robert Koehler of Variety wrote: "The combo of cheesy effects and martial arts choreographer Cory Yuen's unimaginative staging results in something that's martial artless."

Loren King of the Chicago Tribune gave a favorable review, writing that the movie delivered "the high-octane sequences starring martial-arts expert Jet Li with precision and well-crafted pace." King gave a score of 3 out of 4. Sean Axmaker of the Seattle Post-Intelligencer also gave a favourable review noting that James Wong "manage[d] to create a fun, inventive, mischievously tongue-in-cheek showcase" giving a B− score.

Home media
The home video release of The One took place on August 19, 2002. The DVD release contained audio commentary, interviews with James Wong, Jet Li and others. Almar Haflidason of the BBC reviewed the DVD release giving a score of 4 out of 5.
A Blu Ray version was released in the UK by 88 Films in November 2022 with additional special features.

References

External links
 
 One, The (Special Edition) - DVD on Sony Pictures Entertainment
The One on Jet Li's website

2001 films
2001 martial arts films
2001 science fiction action films
2000s superhero films
American martial arts films
American science fiction action films
American superhero films
Columbia Pictures films
2000s English-language films
Films scored by Trevor Rabin
Films directed by James Wong (filmmaker)
Films set in Los Angeles
Films shot in Los Angeles
Kung fu films
Wushu films
Martial arts science fiction films
Films about parallel universes
Revolution Studios films
2000s American films